Gazipur City Corporation ( - in short: GCC) established in 2013, is one of the city corporations of Bangladesh. Gazipur City Corporation's total area is 329.23 square kilometers with approximately has the population of 4,000,000 people in the city corporation area. As of 2018, Gazipur City Corporation had 1.1 million voters.

Services 
The Gazipur City Corporation is responsible for administering and providing basic infrastructure to the city.
 Evict illegal installations.
 Purify and supply water.
 Treat and dispose of contaminated water and sewage.
 Eliminate waterlogging.
 Garbage removal and street cleaning.
 To manage solid waste.
 To arrange hospital and dispensary.
 Construction and maintenance of roads.
 Installation of electric street lights.
 Establish car parking.
 Maintenance parks and playground.
 Maintenance of cemeteries and crematoriums.
 Preparation of birth and death registration certificate.
 Preserving the traditional place.
 Disease control, immunization.
 Establishment of city corporation schools and colleges.

List of officeholders

Elections

Election Result 2018

Election Result 2013

Important establishments

 Islamic University of Technology (IUT)
 Bangabandhu Sheikh Mujibur Rahman Agricultural University (BSMRAU)
 Bangladesh Rice Research Institute (BRRI)
 Bangladesh Agricultural Research Institute (BARI)
 Dhaka University of Engineering and Technology (DUET)
 Rani Bilashmoni Govt. Boys' High School
 Seed Certification Agency (SCA)
 National Agricultural Training Academy (NATA)
 Agricultural Training Institute (ATI)
 Shahid Tazuddin Ahmed Medical College
 Joydebpur Govt. Girls' High School
 Bhawal Badre Alam Govt. University College
 National University
 Bangladesh Open University
 Bangladesh Machine Tools Factory Ltd. (BMTF)
 Security Printing Press Ltd.
 Bangladesh Ordinance Factory(BOF)
 Bangladesh Diesel Plant Ltd.
 Ansar Academy
 Bangabandhu Safari Park
 Hi-tech Park

Corruption allegation against officials
In May 2019 at a press briefing, the acting mayor Jahangir Alam revealed that 14 employees of Gazipur City Corporation got show cause notice over corruption and irregularity charges. In July same year in another press briefing, mayor Jahangir said that among the 14 accused employees, 6 had been suspended, 3 had been temporarily suspended and the remaining 5 had been served show-cause notices for alleged corruption.

Murder of Engineer Delwoar

On May 11, 2020 Delwoar Hossain, the executive engineer of Gazipur City Corporation was murdered allegedly by his colleague. The investigation agency and Delwoar's family suspects that the  motive behind Delwoar's murder was corruption.
Police has arrested Anisur Rahman Selim, an assistant engineer of Gazipur City Corporation as a suspect of the murder case. Mayor Jahangir Alam told the Prothom Alo that he knew about the corruption of Selim but never took any measures against him.

References

 
City Corporations of Bangladesh
Gazipur